Sare Chuattar Ghosh Para (2014) is an Indian Bengali film directed by Soumya Supriyo and produced by Ajit Sureka. The music of the film was composed by Ashok Bhadra.

Plot 
The story of the film revolves around Sagnik, Anindya and Kaushi, who live together and dream big. Anindya wants to become a hero, Kaushik is a boxer and is desirous to marry his boxer coach, and Sagnik wants to become a playback singer. However none of them can pursue their goals for lack of money and other reasons. On day they see an advertisement promising  and jump for the opportunity.

Cast 
 Arnab Banerjee
 Vivek Trivedi
 Pamela
 Partho Sarathi Chakraborty

Reception 
The film received mostly negative reviews. in The Times of India critic rating, the film got half out of five stars and wrote this is probably the most badly made buddy-comedy flick ever made in the history of Indian Cinema.

References 

Bengali-language Indian films
2010s Bengali-language films
2014 films